Joan Marie Finney (née McInroy; February 12, 1925 – July 28, 2001) was an American politician who served as the 42nd governor of Kansas from 1991 to 1995. Prior to her tenure as governor, Finney served four terms as the Kansas state treasurer from 1975 to 1991. Finney was the first woman to hold either office.

Early life
Finney was born Joan Marie McInroy in Topeka, Kansas. She was the daughter of Leonard and Mary Sands McInroy. Her father abandoned the family shortly after her birth. McInroy graduated from high school in Manhattan, Kansas in 1942. In 1957, she married Spencer Finney, Jr. The Finneys had three children: Sarah "Sally" Finney Timm, Richard Finney, and Mary Finney Holladay. In 1978, Finney graduated from Washburn University with a bachelor's degree in economic history.

Early political career
From 1953 to 1969, Finney served on the staff of Republican U.S. Senator Frank Carlson. From 1970 to 1972, she served as Commissioner of Elections for Shawnee County, Kansas. In 1972, running as a Republican, she was an unsuccessful candidate for a U.S. House seat in Kansas's 2nd congressional district. She also served as a special assistant to Topeka Mayor Bill McCormick.

After switching her political affiliation from Republican to Democrat, Finney served as Kansas State Treasurer from 1975 to 1991. She was the first woman to hold that position.

Governorship
In the 1990 Democratic primary for governor of Kansas, Finney upset former Governor John W. Carlin. She then went on to defeat incumbent Republican Mike Hayden in the general election, becoming the first woman in U.S. history to defeat an incumbent governor in a general election.

In addition to being the State of Kansas's first female governor, Finney was the first Roman Catholic governor of Kansas. She was known for her pro-Native American stances and was one of the few anti-abortion Democratic governors of her time. 

Finney served only one term as governor, retiring after the 1994 election.

Post-governorship
In 1996, Finney ran for United States Senate. She was defeated in the Democratic primary by Jill Docking, who gained 74% of the primary vote, and subsequently lost the general election to Sam Brownback.

Finney died in 2001 from complications of liver cancer at St. Francis Hospital in Topeka. She is buried in Mount Calvary Cemetery in Topeka.

See also
List of female governors in the United States

References

External links
 
Publications concerning Kansas Governor Finney's administration available via the KGI Online Library

External links
 

|-

|-

1925 births
2001 deaths
20th-century American politicians
20th-century American women politicians
Deaths from cancer in Kansas
Deaths from liver cancer
Democratic Party governors of Kansas
Governors of Kansas
Kansas Democrats
Kansas Republicans
Politicians from Manhattan, Kansas
Politicians from Topeka, Kansas
State treasurers of Kansas
Washburn University alumni
Women in Kansas politics
Women state governors of the United States
Women state constitutional officers of Kansas
Catholics from Kansas